Timocratica albitogata is a moth in the family Depressariidae. It was described by Vitor O. Becker in 1982. It is found in Brazil in the states of Paraná, Mato Grosso and Rio de Janeiro.

References

Moths described in 1982
Taxa named by Vitor Becker
Timocratica